They Killed Sister Dorothy is a 2008 American documentary film directed by Daniel Junge about Dorothy Stang, an American-born Brazilian nun who was murdered on February 12, 2005, in Anapu, a city located in the Amazon Rainforest.

The film is narrated by Martin Sheen in the English version and by Wagner Moura in the Portuguese version.

Synopsis
The film traces the reasons of the murder of Dayton, Ohio, native Dorothy Mae Stang, a 73-year-old nun of the Sisters of Notre Dame de Namur order who fought for the preservation of the Amazon Rainforest in the Brazilian state of Pará. It also follows the trial of those convicted for murdering Stang.

Release and awards
The film received the Audience Award and the Competition Award at the 2008 South by Southwest Festival, where it had its worldwide premiere. In Brazil, where the film title received a literal translation, it premiered at the 2007 Rio de Janeiro Film Festival. It was also screened at the 32nd São Paulo International Film Festival. It is planned to receive a nationwide release on February 13, 2009.

The film and its song "Forever", written and performed by Bebel Gilberto, daughter of Bossa Nova pioneer João Gilberto, were pre-selected for the Academy Awards for Best Documentary Feature and Best Original Song, respectively.

External links
 
 
 Who Killed Sister Dorothy? - NOW on PBS

2008 films
American documentary films
American independent films
Portuguese-language films
Documentary films about crime
Forestry in Brazil
Forest conservation
2008 documentary films
Films directed by Daniel Junge
Documentary films about forests and trees
2008 independent films
2000s English-language films
2000s American films